The 42nd Golden Globe Awards, honoring the best in film and television for 1984, were held on January 27, 1985.

Winners and nominees

Film 

The following films received multiple nominations:

The following films received multiple wins:

Television

The following programs received multiple nominations:

The following programs received multiple wins:

Ceremony

Presenters 

 Christopher Atkins
 Karen Black
 Bruce Boxleitner
 Sonia Braga
 Eileen Brennan
 Diahann Carroll
 Lynda Carter
 Nell Carter
 Joanna Cassidy
 Mary Crosby
 Jamie Lee Curtis
 Angie Dickinson
 Faye Dunaway
 Morgan Fairchild
 Peter Falk
 Peter Fonda
 Glenn Ford
 Elliott Gould
 Stewart Granger
 Engelbert Humperdinck
 Ann Jillian
 Howard Keel
 Kris Kristofferson
 Diane Lane
 Cloris Leachman
 Rich Little
 Tony Lo Bianco
 Rob Lowe
 Marilyn McCoo
 Donna Mills
 Liza Minnelli
 Michael Pare
 Nia Peeples
 George Peppard
 Alfonso Ribeiro
 Ricky Schroder
 William Shatner
 Brooke Shields
 Andrew Stevens
 Cicely Tyson

Cecil B. DeMille Award 
Elizabeth Taylor

See also
57th Academy Awards
5th Golden Raspberry Awards
36th Primetime Emmy Awards
37th Primetime Emmy Awards
 38th British Academy Film Awards
 39th Tony Awards
 1984 in film
 1984 in American television

References
IMDb - 1985 Golden Globe Awards

042
1984 film awards
1984 television awards
January 1985 events in the United States
Golden Globe